Jacques Bolle (born 1 February 1959 in Grenoble) is a French former Grand Prix motorcycle road racer. His best year was in 1981 when he finished in fifth place in the 125cc world championship riding for the Motobécane factory. His only Grand Prix victory was at the 1983 250cc British Grand Prix. Bolle has held the position of president of the French Motorcycle Federation since 2008.

References

1959 births
Living people
Sportspeople from Grenoble
French motorcycle racers
125cc World Championship riders
250cc World Championship riders
350cc World Championship riders